In operations management and industrial engineering, production flow analysis refers to methods which share the following characteristics:

 Classification of machines
 Technological cycles information control
 Generating a binary product-machines matrix (1 if a given product requires processing in a given machine, 0 otherwise)

Methods differ on how they group together machines with products. These play an important role in designing manufacturing cells.

Rank Order Clustering

Given a binary product-machines n-by-m matrix , Rank Order Clustering is an algorithm characterized by the following steps:

 For each row i compute the number 
 Order rows according to descending numbers previously computed
 For each column p compute the number 
 Order columns according to descending numbers previously computed
 If on steps 2 and 4 no reordering happened go to step 6, otherwise go to step 1
 Stop

Similarity coefficients

Given a binary product-machines n-by-m matrix, the algorithm proceeds by the following steps:

 Compute the similarity coefficient  for all  with  being the number of products that need to be processed on both machine i and machine j, u comprises the number of components which visit machine j but not k and vice versa.
 Group together in cell k the tuple (i*,j*) with higher similarity coefficient, with k being the algorithm iteration index
 Remove row i* and column j* from the original binary matrix and substitute for the row and column of the cell k, 
 Go to step 2, iteration index k raised by one

Unless this procedure is stopped the algorithm eventually will put all machines in one single group.

References

Industrial engineering